The Blue Hills State Police Barracks is on Hillside Street in Milton, Massachusetts.  It houses the police and patrol offices of the Blue Hills Reservation, a Massachusetts state park administered by the Massachusetts Department of Conservation and Recreation (DCR).  The -story building was designed by Stickney & Austin and built in 1904 out of Quincy granite.  The building is an elongated Cape-style building, with eight bays across and three deep.  The roof line is pierced by eight evenly spaced gable dormers and two chimneys.

The building was listed on the National Register of Historic Places on September 25, 1980.

See also
National Register of Historic Places listings in Milton, Massachusetts

References

Government buildings on the National Register of Historic Places in Massachusetts
Buildings and structures completed in 1904
Buildings and structures in Norfolk County, Massachusetts
Milton, Massachusetts
National Register of Historic Places in Milton, Massachusetts
Barracks on the National Register of Historic Places